Diéké,  Djécké  or Diecke is a town and sub-prefecture in the Yomou Prefecture in the Nzérékoré Region of south-eastern Guinea.

Mining 

It is near the very large Simandou iron ore mines.

Schools 
 École de Santé de Diéké
 Lycée Méthodiste Unie de Diéké

Hospitals 
 Centre Médical Soguipa
 Clinique Saint Michel
 Centre de Santé de Diéké

See also 

 Transport in Guinea

References 

Sub-prefectures of the Nzérékoré Region